Stanislav Malamov (born 21 September 1989) is a Bulgarian professional footballer who plays as a winger for Maritsa Plovdiv.

Career
Born in Stamboliyski, Malamov began his football career at the age of 7, playing for hometown club FC Trakia. He spent a six years at the club before moving to Maritsa Plovdiv in 2002 at the age of 13. In the summer of 2008, Malamov was included in the Maritsa first-team squad.

On 12 December 2011, Malamov joined Lokomotiv Plovdiv. He made his A PFG debut in a 2–0 win over Chernomorets Burgas on 10 March 2012, coming on as a substitute for Dakson. On 24 May 2016, he scored the winning goal for CSKA Sofia in the 2016 Bulgarian Cup Final.

Honours

Club
CSKA Sofia
 Bulgarian Cup: 2015–16

References

External links

Living people
1989 births
Bulgarian footballers
Association football midfielders
FC Maritsa Plovdiv players
PFC Nesebar players
PFC Lokomotiv Plovdiv players
FC Haskovo players
PFC CSKA Sofia players
Neftochimic Burgas players
FC Septemvri Sofia players
FC Vitosha Bistritsa players
FC Vereya players
First Professional Football League (Bulgaria) players